Atlantic Sun Tournament may refer to the championship of any sport sponsored by the ASUN Conference (formerly Atlantic Sun Conference) including the following:
ASUN men's basketball tournament
ASUN Men's Soccer Tournament
ASUN Conference baseball tournament
ASUN women's basketball tournament